South Lyon is a city in Oakland County in the U.S. state of Michigan. The population was 11,746 at the 2020 census, up from 11,327 at the 2010 census.

Geography

History
South Lyon was founded in 1832 and was called Thompson's Corners.  In the same year, the surrounding township was named Lyon after Lucius Lyon, a member of the state legislature.  The village was given a name for its location within the township. South Lyon was incorporated as a village in 1873 and as a city in 1930.

Three rail lines once passed through South Lyon. In the summer of 1871, the Detroit, Lansing, and Northern Railroad were built west from Plymouth on the way to Lansing and Ionia.  In 1880, the predecessor to the Ann Arbor Railroad built a line into town from Ann Arbor.  This line's goal was to continue toward Pontiac, but that did not occur under the original owners.  The line was pulled up around 1890.  In 1883 the Grand Trunk built their Jackson Branch from Pontiac to Jackson, which crossed the Pere Marquette at South Lyon.  The GTW branch line continued to serve South Lyon until the early 1980s. The branch line is now a paved bicycle trail through town, and Reynold Sweet Parkway follows the original route.  Today, South Lyon hosts the CSX main line from Detroit to Grand Rapids, and a passing track is located there.

Demographics

2020 census
As of the census of 2020, there were 11,746 people residing in 4,963 households within the city. There are an average of 2.36 people per household in South Lyon. 88% of South Lyon residents have been living in their house for over a year, excluding those younger than 1-year-old. 93.7% of South Lyon households own a computer, and 89% have a broadband Internet subscription.

54.8% of South Lyon residents are female, and 45.2% are male. The racial makeup of the city was 94.4% White, 1.9% Asian, 2.5% multiracial, and .9% Black. 4.1% of residents of any race were Hispanic or Latino. 5.9% of residents are foreign-born and 6.1% of residents older than 5 speak a language other than English at home. 21.9% of South Lyon residents are under 18 years old, and 16.6% are 65 years old and above. 7.2% of South Lyon residents under 65 years old have a disability.

69.4% of South Lyon residents 16 years and older are part of the labor force, and the median commute time for South Lyon workers is 29.9 minutes. The median household income in South Lyon is $73,200, and the median per capita income is $39,016 (in 2019 dollars). 5.6% of South Lyon residents are in poverty. As of 2012, there were 1,106 businesses with over $1,000 of receipts located in South Lyon.

The median value of homes in South Lyon is $192,100, and the median gross rent is $1,042.

Education
93% of South Lyon residents older than 25 have graduated from high school, and 42% have graduated from college with a bachelor's degree or higher.

South Lyon Community Schools
South Lyon is served by South Lyon Community Schools, a public school district that "includes three counties, three townships, and covers 83 square miles." It includes an Early Childhood Center, eight elementary schools (Bartlett Elementary, Brummer Elementary, Dolsen Elementary, Hardy Elementary, Kent Lake Elementary, Pearson Elementary, Salem Elementary, and Sayre Elementary), two middle schools (Millennium Middle School and Centennial Middle School), and two high schools (South Lyon High School and South Lyon East High School). Both high schools are members of the Lakes Valley Conference and the Michigan High School Athletic Association (MHSAA).

Government
South Lyon has a council-manager style of governance. The current mayor is Daniel L. Pelchat, an information technology specialist for South Lyon Community Schools. The current city manager is Paul C. Zelenak, who has been serving since 2018, when he was hired from Linden, Michigan. The city council convenes bimonthly at City Hall and is currently composed of Lisa Dilg, Alex Hansen, Stephen Kennedy (Mayor Pro-Tem), Glenn Kivell, Margaret Kurtzweil, and Lori Moiser.

Parks

McHattie Park 
South Lyon's McHattie Park (on the west side of Pontiac Trail between 9 Mile and 10 Mile Roads) is a nearly 15-acre park that includes "playground equipment, little league ball diamonds, sand volleyball courts, sledding hill, along with plenty of open spaces for picnics and outdoor fun." It is also the location of the Witch's Hat Depot Museum and Historic Village. The historic village consists of six buildings: Washburn School (built 1907), Queen Anne Depot (aka the Witch's Hat, built 1909), the Caboose (circa 1926), the Little Village Chapel (built 1930), the Freight House (built 1984), and the Gazebo (1990). With the exceptions of the Freight House and the Gazebo, constructed on-site, the historic buildings were moved to the park from their original sites starting with the Witch's Hat in 1976. These buildings are open to the public at various times, and the Little Village Chapel is available for 75 guests or fewer wedding rentals. The South Lyon Historical Society is attempting to add a 100-year-old barn, currently located in Salem Township, to the site, with an estimated cost of $200,000.

McHattie Park and the Museum and Historic Village host public events. Concerts in the Park are held most weeks in the summertime, and the annual Depot Days festival is held in early autumn.

McHattie Park is also connected to a portion of the Huron Valley Rail Trail, a public pedestrian and bicycle trail that was once a rail line. The trail is managed by the Western Oakland County Trailway Management Council.

Volunteer Park 
Volunteer Park is a 130-acre park located on Dixboro Road between 8 Mile and 9 Mile roads. It features a variety of sports fields, baseball diamonds, a volleyball court, and a picnic structure. It, too, is connected to the Huron Valley Rail Trail.

Paul Baker Memorial Park 
Paul Baker Memorial Park is a small park that consists of a fountain, a small gazebo, and a few benches. It is located at the intersection of Lake Street and Reynold Sweet Parkway, beside the railroad tracks.

Notable people 
 Dave Brandon – chairman & CEO of Toys "R" Us, former athletic director at the University of Michigan, former CEO of Domino's Pizza, and Valassis
 Anita Cochran – country music singer
 John Heffron – stand-up comedian
 Barbara Lewis – singer, "Baby, I'm Yours"
 Mitch Ryder – musician, The Detroit Wheels
 Danny Spanos – drummer for 1970s band Redbone, two solo albums in 1980s, hit song "Hot Cherie" reached #29 on Billboard AOR charts

References

External links

City of South Lyon

Cities in Oakland County, Michigan
Metro Detroit
1832 establishments in Michigan Territory
Populated places established in 1832